Jerome Irving Rodale (August 16, 1898 – June 8, 1971) was a publisher, editor, and author who founded Rodale, Inc. in Emmaus, Pennsylvania, and The Rodale Institute, formerly the Soil Health Foundation.

Rodale was an early advocate of sustainable agriculture and organic farming in the United States. As an author, his work included several magazines and books, including books featuring different authors, on the subject of health. He popularized the term "organic" as a term for growing food without pesticides. Rodale also published works on other topics, including The Synonym Finder.

On June 8, 1971, Rodale died after suffering a fatal heart attack while appearing as a guest on a segment, which never aired, for The Dick Cavett Show. Rodale was taken to Roosevelt Hospital Center and pronounced dead on arrival at age 72.

Biography
Rodale was born in Manhattan on August 16, 1898, the son of an Orthodox Jewish grocer who immigrated from Poland, and raised in the tenements in the Lower East Side. Due to a poor relationship with his father, whose last name was Cohen (originally Lachofsky), he changed his surname to Rodale as an ode to his mother's maiden name, Rouda. He worked as an accountant for New York City from 1917-20 and worked for the Internal Revenue Service from 1920-21. Rodale and his brother, Joseph, co-founded Rodale Manufacturing, a maker of electrical equipment, in New York in 1923. He married Anna Andrews in 1927; she died in 2000 at 95. They had three children: Robert Rodale (1930–1990), Nina Rodale, and Ruth Rodale. 

Rodale was already concerned with his health at this time, as he had heart murmurs and had been rejected from the Army in World War I for bad eyesight. To improve his health, he read the works of Bernarr Macfadden and invented an exercising device. 
The Rodale brothers moved Rodale Manufacturing to Emmaus, Pennsylvania in 1930 to cut costs during the Great Depression. He founded Rodale Press in 1930, marketing books and magazines. Inspired by his encounter with the ideas of Albert Howard, he developed an interest in promoting a healthy and active lifestyle that emphasized organically grown foods, and established the Rodale Organic Gardening Experimental Farm in 1940. In 1942, Rodale Press started publishing Organic Farming and Gardening magazine, which promotes organic horticulture; it was later retitled Organic Gardening. In 1945, he wrote Pay Dirt, the first American book on organic gardening. To Rodale, agriculture and health were inseparable. He felt that soil required compost and eschewed pesticides and synthetic fertilizers and that plants grown in such soil would help people stay healthier.

One of Rodale's most successful projects was Prevention magazine, founded in 1950, which promotes disease prevention rather than trying to cure it later. It pioneered the return to whole grains, unrefined sweets, using little fat in food preparation, folk cures, herbal medicines and breastfeeding. It also promoted the consumption of higher than typical amounts of nutritional supplements and forgoing nicotine and caffeine. Rodale opposed the consumption of milk and sugar, which he blamed for many diseases. He was not a vegetarian and frequently denounced vegetarianism. Rodale once stated "I'm going to live to be 100, unless I'm run down by some sugar-crazed taxi driver."

Rodale was also a playwright, operating the Cecilwood Theater in Fishkill, New York and the off-Broadway Rodale Theater at 62 East Fourth Street in the East Village of New York City. His plays included Toinette (1961) and The Hairy Falsetto (1964).

Views

Medical experts have described Rodale as a promoter of quackery. For example, Rodale accused sugar of "causing criminals," and blamed various diseases including bronchitis and pneumonia on the consumption of bread. He also believed that consumers of cola drinks would become sterile.

Rodale was an anti-vaccinationist. He also made dubious claims about cancer. In his book Happy People Rarely Get Cancer (1970), Rodale said, "Negroes get less cancer than whites, for the Negro is a happy race. True, there is their problem of segregation, but the Negro race being what it is, I think a Negro sings just the same, and is not going to let segregation dampen his spirits as much as a similar problem would do to the white person."

It was reported that Rodale took seventy food supplements every day. He was criticized for promoting unsubstantiated claims about vitamin supplements. Stephen Barrett of Quackwatch commented that Prevention magazine was filled with "nonsense promoting dietary supplements... many articles contained therapeutic claims that would be illegal on product labels."

The Oxford Encyclopedia of Food and Drink in America noted that the agricultural establishment "dismissed Rodale as a quack, crank, a gadfly, and a manure-pile worshiper."

Death
On June 8, 1971, Rodale died of a heart attack at the age of 72 while a guest on an early-evening taping of The Dick Cavett Show. The episode was slated to be aired later that evening. Rodale had stated during his just-completed interview on the show, "I'm in such good health that I fell down a long flight of stairs yesterday and I laughed all the way," "I've decided to live to be a hundred," and "I never felt better in my life!" He had also previously said, "I'm going to live to be 100, unless I'm run down by some sugar-crazed taxi driver." Rodale's last interaction with Cavett before dying was "offering the host his special asparagus boiled in urine".

After his interview, Rodale remained onstage and was seated on a couch beside the next interviewee, New York Post columnist Pete Hamill. According to Dick Cavett, Hamill noticed that Rodale had appeared to lose consciousness and leaned over to Cavett and said, "This looks bad." Cavett is then said to have quipped, "Are we boring you, Mr. Rodale?" Cavett himself has "emphatically" denied any memory of saying this, though others who were in the studio have recalled it. Shortly thereafter, Cavett asked if there were any doctors in the audience. An internist and orthopedic surgeon, both in residency, rushed onto the stage and tried to revive Rodale with cardiopulmonary resuscitation. During an appearance on The Tonight Show Starring Johnny Carson that originally aired February 5, 1982, Cavett said that "firefighters from across the street" also came to  Rodale's aid. Although an electrocardiogram continued to show cardiac activity, Rodale could not be revived and was pronounced dead on arrival at Roosevelt Hospital. The episode was never broadcast, although Cavett described the story in public appearances and on his blog.

Legacy

After Rodale's death, his son Robert Rodale ran the publishing firm until his own death in a car accident in 1990. That work included editing the high-circulation Prevention magazine. Robert had competed in the Olympics in rifle shooting and was inducted into the United States Bicycling Hall of Fame in 1991.

Rodale's granddaughter Maria Rodale became chairman and CEO of Rodale, Inc. She attributes her interest in the organic food movement to growing up on America's first certified organic farm.
In October 2017, New York media giant Hearst announced it would acquire the magazine and book businesses of the 90-year-old Rodale Inc. for an undisclosed sum.

Books 

Pay Dirt: Farming & Gardening with Composts, 1945.
 The Synonym Finder, 1978.  
 How to Grow Vegetables and Fruits by the Organic Method,  1961. 
 The Word Finder, 1947.  
 The Encyclopedia of Organic Gardening.  
 Stone Mulching in the Garden.
 Vegetables.
 The Healthy Hunzas, 1948, Rodale Press, Emmaus, PA. 255 p.
 Are We Really Living Longer?
 Arthritis, Rheumatism, and Your Aching Back.
 Cancer, Facts & Fallacies.
 Happy People Rarely Get Cancer, 1970.
 The Complete Book of Composting.
 The Hairy Falsetto:  A One-Act Farcical Social Satire.
 The complete Book of Vitamins, 1966. 
 The natural way to better eyesight 1966.
 The Prostate 1967, Rodale Books, Inc., Emmaus, PA. D-739; Harald Taub, Designer and Editor; Sowers Printing Co., Lebanon, PA.
 Sugar: The Curse of Civilization, 1967.
 Lower your Pulse and Live Longer, 1971.
 Magnesium, the Nutrient that Could Change Your Life, 1978.

See also
 Men's Health (magazine)

References

Further reading
 Jackson, Carlton. J.I. Rodale:  Apostle of Nonconformity. (New York: Pyramid Books, 1973).  This biography details most of the material in the article above.
 Perényi, Eleanor. "Apostle of the Compost Heap". Saturday Evening Post, July 16, 1966: 30-33.

External links 
 
Organic Gardening magazine website
Prevention magazine website

1898 births
1971 deaths
20th-century American businesspeople
20th-century American dramatists and playwrights
20th-century American male writers
Alternative cancer treatment advocates
American anti-vaccination activists
American book publishers (people)
American magazine publishers (people)
Critics of vegetarianism
Deaths onstage
Farmers from Pennsylvania
Filmed deaths from natural causes
Jewish American writers
Organic farmers
People from Lehigh County, Pennsylvania
People from the Lower East Side
Pseudoscientific diet advocates
Rodale, Inc.
Writers from Manhattan
Writers from Pennsylvania